Acetonema is a genus of bacteria in the family Veillonellaceae. It is H2-oxidizing CO2-reducing acetogenic strictly anaerobic endospore-forming Gram-negative motile rod-shaped, isolated from gut contents of the wood-feeding termite Pterotermes occidentis. Cells are catalase positive, oxidase negative, and have 51.5 mol percent G + C in their DNA. Optimum conditions for growth on H2 + CO2 are at 30–33 degrees C and pH (initial) 7.8. Acetonema longum is the sole species within the genus.

References 

Eubacteriales
Monotypic bacteria genera
Bacteria genera